Đorđe Crnomarković (born 10 September 1993) is a Serbian professional footballer who plays as a defender for Olimpija Ljubljana.

Club career
Crnomarković started career playing with Beograd, and later played for Šumadija Jagnjilo for a season and a half. In early 2014, he signed with Donji Srem. He made his Serbian SuperLiga debut for Donji Srem in an away match versus Čukarički on 17 April 2014. In summer 2015, he joined Javor Ivanjica. On 26 June 2016, he joined Slovenian champions Olimpija Ljubljana on a three-year contract. Shortly after leaving Olimpija, Crnomarković made a deal with Čukarički in May 2017. In late 2017, Crnomarković mutually terminated his contract with Čukarički, after which he returned to Javor Ivanjica in January 2018. In June 2018, Crnomarković moved to Radnički Niš.

Lech Poznań
On 25 June 2019, Crnomarković signed a three-year contract with Polish side Lech Poznań. He made his debut for Lech on 20 July 2019 in a game against defending champions Piast Gliwice.

Career statistics

References

External links
 Đorđe Crnomarković stats at utakmica.rs
 
 
 
 
 

1993 births
Living people
Footballers from Belgrade
Association football defenders
Serbian footballers
FK Beograd players
FK Donji Srem players
FK Javor Ivanjica players
NK Olimpija Ljubljana (2005) players
FK Čukarički players
FK Radnički Niš players
Lech Poznań players
Zagłębie Lubin players
Serbian SuperLiga players
Ekstraklasa players
Slovenian PrvaLiga players
Serbian expatriate footballers
Serbian expatriate sportspeople in Slovenia
Expatriate footballers in Slovenia
Serbian expatriate sportspeople in Poland
Expatriate footballers in Poland